Artabazanes of Media Atropatene (or ;  ; flourished 3rd century BC) was a Prince and King of the Atropatene Kingdom. He ruled in 221 BC or 220 BC and was a contemporary of the Seleucid Greek King Antiochus III the Great.

He was presumably of Iranian lineage. Artabazanes is said to be a grandson of the Persian King Darius III. The father of Artabazanes was one of the four sons born to Darius III from his union with the daughter of Gobryas prior to his accession.

References

3rd-century BC rulers
Rulers of Media Atropatene
3rd-century BC Iranian people
Darius III